Abraham Phineas Nasatir (1903 – January 18, 1991) was an American educator and historian who specialized in early California and the Mississippi Valley areas.

Nasatir was born in Santa Ana, California, to Jewish parents who had immigrated from Lithuania. He completed his Ph.D. at the University of California, Berkeley when he was 19. He largely studied under Herbert Eugene Bolton at UC Berkeley.

Career and contributions
After receiving his Ph.D., Nasatir taught Latin American History for one year at the University of Iowa. Beginning in 1927, taught for 50 years at San Diego State University. In 1986 SDSU named a wing of its social sciences building in his honor.

Nasatir was the recipient of four Fulbright fellowships, and traveled to France, Spain and Chile for research. He published 19 books, and is credited with publishing some 300,000 pages of documents, studies and translations.

He was named Distinguished Professor of the California State College System. He received the Henry R. Wagner Medal of Honor. He presided over the international chapter of Phi Alpha Theta, an international history honor society.

Personal
Nasatir was one of four children: three boys and a girl. He married Ida Hirsch; they had no children. He actively supported the activities of the California Jewish community. He died from complications of pneumonia at Mercy Hospital in Los Angeles, California.

In 1985 Nasatir's house was among those destroyed in the Normal Heights Fire, along with 500,000 documents and 2,500 books in his possession.  Although this was a truly significant loss, Nasatir had published or used extensively as sources in publication such a large percentage of the documents he had in his possession that the loss was not as devastating as it would have otherwise been.  Nasatir himself thanked God that no one was hurt in the fire.

Nasatir was an Orthodox Jew.  He was survived by his wife Ida.

Zoe, brilliant French student in a master project, decided to continue the work of Abraham Nasatir completing his findings on the references of the term "California" in French newspapers.

References

External links

1903 births
1991 deaths
People from Santa Ana, California
American Orthodox Jews
University of California, Berkeley alumni
University of Iowa faculty
San Diego State University faculty
Historians of California
20th-century American historians
20th-century American male writers
American people of Lithuanian-Jewish descent
Historians from California
American male non-fiction writers